Northway Army Airfield is a former United States Army airfield located in Northway, a community located in the Southeast Fairbanks Census Area of the U.S. state of Alaska. During World War II for northbound Lend-Lease aircraft on the Northwest Staging Route, the flight strip at Northway was the first stop in the Territory of Alaska. It is now the state owned Northway Airport.

See also 

 Alaska World War II Army Airfields
 Air Transport Command
 Northwest Staging Route

References

 

Airfields of the United States Army Air Forces Air Transport Command in Alaska
Airfields of the United States Army Air Forces in Alaska
Closed installations of the United States Army